The blue corydoras or Natterer's catfish (Corydoras nattereri) is a tropical freshwater fish belonging to the subfamily Corydoradinae of the family Callichthyidae. It originates in coastal rivers in South America, and is found in the Brazil from Espírito Santo to Paraná. It is named for Johann Natterer, its discoverer.

The fish has clear fins with no pattern. The ventrals are light, opaque yellow. Highlights seen about the gill plates are green. The belly is yellowish. It has a pronounced dark stripe along the length of the body. General color of the body is light, tending towards yellow. Its eyes are gold.

It feeds on worms, benthic crustaceans, insects, and plant matter. It lays eggs in dense vegetation and adults do not guard the eggs.

The blue corydoras is of commercial importance in the aquarium trade industry.

See also
 List of freshwater aquarium fish species

References

External links
 Photos at Fishbase

Corydoras
Taxa named by Franz Steindachner
Fish described in 1876